Antistea is a genus of dwarf sheet spiders that was first described by Eugène Simon in 1898.  it contains only two species: A. brunnea and A. elegans. Combined, they have a Holarctic distribution, one Palearctic and the other Nearctic.

References

Araneomorphae genera
Hahniidae
Palearctic spiders
Spiders of North America
Taxa named by Eugène Simon